Gregore J. Sambor (February 22, 1928 - September 15, 2015) was an American Police Commissioner of the Philadelphia Police Department from 1984 to 1985. He served for 35 years in the United States Military and earned many awards in marksmanship. He is most known for his role in the 1985 bombing of MOVE, in which six adults and five children died after he told firefighters to stand down and "let the fire burn". Sambor argued the group was a terrorist organization.

1985 MOVE bombing
On May 13, 1985, nearly 500 police officers moved in to execute arrest warrants on MOVE's members. Police commissioner Sambor read a long speech to the members of the organization. When they didn't respond, police moved in to forcibly remove them from the premises, leading to an armed standoff. After the police used over ten thousand rounds of ammunition, Sambor ordered the compound be breached. Two breaching charges made from an FBI-supplied explosive were dropped on the roof of the building, which ignited the fuel of a gasoline-powered generator there. Ramona Africa, the only adult survivor, reported that police shot at anyone attempting to escape the fire. In the end, 11 MOVE members including 5 children were killed in the blaze and 250 civilians were left homeless.

Sambor resigned as police commissioner in November of that year of his own decision, although advised not to by family and friends. Believing he was being made a "surrogate" by Mayor W. Wilson Goode, he did not wish to remain in the environment.

References

1928 births
2015 deaths
Commissioners of the Philadelphia Police Department